The Myrmecophagidae are a family of anteaters, the name being derived from the Ancient Greek words for 'ant' and 'eat' (myrmeco- and ).   Two genera and three species are in the family, consisting of the giant anteater, and the tamanduas. The fossil Eurotamandua from the Messel Pit in Germany may be an early anteater, but its status is currently debated.

Characteristics
Myrmecophagids are medium to large animals, with distinctively elongated snouts and long, narrow tongues. They have powerful claws on their toes, enabling them to rip open termite mounds and ant nests to eat the insects inside. They have no teeth, but produce a large amount of sticky saliva to trap the insects, as well as backward-pointing spines on their tongues. Ants and termites are almost their only food in the wild, and their primary source of water, although they sometimes also drink free-standing water, and occasionally eat fruits.

Distribution 
Myrmecophagids are found in Central and South America, from southern Belize and Guatemala to northern Argentina.

Reproduction 
Most myrmecophagids are solitary, meeting only to mate. Myrmecophagids are polygamous and the male generally has no role in caring for the young. The male silky anteater is an exception and helps to feed its young. The gestation period of myrmecophagids ranges from 120 to 190 days. Myrmecophagids typically give birth to one offspring at a time, and the cub lives on its mothers back for 6–9 months after it is born. Myrmecophagids have such sharp claws that they cannot touch their young without causing injury.

Evolutionary history 
Myrmecophagids belong to the Xenarthra, formerly known as Edentata, which also includes sloths and armadillos. Edentates (meaning without teeth) diverged from insectivores during the Cretaceous period, roughly 135 million years ago. The fossil record of the family Myrmecophagidae dates to the Early Miocene in South America, roughly 25 million years ago. Throughout their evolutionary history, myrmecophagids have maintained a narrow range, though at one point their range may have extended to northern Mexico.

Taxonomy
Order: Pilosa
Suborder: Folivora
Suborder: Vermilingua
Family: Cyclopedidae
Genus: Cyclopes
Species: Cyclopes didactylus - silky anteater
Family: Myrmecophagidae
Genus: Protamandua †
Genus: Myrmecophaga
Species: Myrmecophaga tridactyla - giant anteater
Genus: Neotamandua †
Genus: Tamandua
Species: Tamandua mexicana - northern tamandua
Species: Tamandua tetradactyla - southern tamandua

References

 "Anteaters: Myrmecophagidae - Behavior And Reproduction." - Female, Silky, Claws, and Birth. 08 Nov. 2015.
 "Anteater Online." Anteater Online. 08 Nov. 2015.

Mammals of Colombia
Anteaters
Mammal families
Extant Miocene first appearances
Taxa named by John Edward Gray